Haight-Ashbury is a district of San Francisco, California, named for the intersection of Haight and Ashbury streets. It is also called The Haight and The Upper Haight. The neighborhood is known as one of the main centers of the counterculture of the 1960s.

Location
The district generally encompasses the neighborhood surrounding Haight Street, bounded by Stanyan Street and Golden Gate Park on the west, Oak Street and the Golden Gate Park Panhandle on the north, Baker Street and Buena Vista Park to the east and Frederick Street and Ashbury Heights and Cole Valley neighborhoods to the south.

The street names commemorate two early San Francisco leaders: pioneer and exchange banker Henry Haight, and Munroe Ashbury, a member of the San Francisco Board of Supervisors from 1864 to 1870.

Both Haight and his nephew, as well as Ashbury, had a hand in the planning of the neighborhood and nearby Golden Gate Park at its inception. The name "Upper Haight" is also used by locals in contrast to the Haight-Fillmore or Lower Haight.

The Beats had congregated around San Francisco's North Beach neighborhood from the late 1950s. Many who could not find accommodation there turned to the quaint, relatively cheap and underpopulated Haight-Ashbury.
 
Later, the Haight-Ashbury district is noted for its role as one of the main center of the hippie movement. The Summer of Love (1967) and much of the counterculture of the 1960s have been synonymous with San Francisco and the Haight-Ashbury neighborhood ever since.

History

Farms, entertainment, and homes

Before the completion of the Haight Street Cable Railroad in 1883, what is now the Haight-Ashbury was a collection of isolated farms and acres of sand dunes. The Haight cable car line, completed in 1883, connected the east end of Golden Gate Park with the geographically central Market Street line and the rest of downtown San Francisco. As the primary gateway to Golden Gate Park, and with an amusement park known as the Chutes on Haight Street between Cole and Clayton Streets between 1895 and 1902 and the California League Baseball Grounds stadium opening in 1887, the area became a popular entertainment destination, especially on weekends. The cable car, land grading and building techniques of the 1890s and early 20th century later reinvented the Haight-Ashbury as a residential upper middle class homeowners' district. It was one of the few neighborhoods spared from the fires that followed the catastrophic San Francisco earthquake of 1906.

Depression and war

The Haight was hit hard by the Depression, as was much of the city. Residents with enough money to spare left the declining and crowded neighborhood for greener pastures within the growing city limits, or newer, smaller suburban homes in the Bay Area. During World War II, the Edwardian and Victorian houses
were divided into apartments to house workers. Others were converted into boarding homes for profit. By the 1950s, the Haight was a neighborhood in decline. Many buildings were left vacant after the war. Deferred maintenance also took its toll, and the exodus of middle class residents to newer suburbs continued to leave many units for rent.

Postwar

In the 1950s, a freeway was proposed that would have run through the Panhandle, but due to a citizen freeway revolt, it was cancelled in a series of battles that lasted until 1966.
The Haight Ashbury Neighborhood Council (HANC) was formed at the time of the 1959 revolt.

The Haight-Ashbury's elaborately detailed, 19th century, multi-story, wooden houses became a haven for hippies during the 1960s, due to the availability of cheap rooms and vacant properties for rent or sale in the district; property values had dropped in part because of the proposed freeway.
The alternative culture that subsequently flourished there took root, and to some extent, has remained to this day.

Hippie community
The mainstream media's coverage of hippie life in the Haight-Ashbury drew the attention of youth from all over America. Hunter S. Thompson labeled the district "Hashbury" in The New York Times Magazine, and the activities in the area were reported almost daily. The Haight-Ashbury district was sought out by hippies to constitute a community based upon counterculture ideals, drugs, and music. This neighborhood offered a concentrated gathering spot for hippies to create a social experiment that would soon spread throughout the nation.

The first head shop, Ron and Jay Thelin's Psychedelic Shop, opened on Haight Street on January 3, 1966, offering hippies a spot to purchase marijuana and LSD, which was essential to hippie life in Haight-Ashbury. Along with businesses like the coffee shop The Blue Unicorn, the Psychedelic Shop quickly became one of the unofficial community centers for the growing numbers of hippies migrating to the neighborhood in 1966–67. The entire hippie community had easy access to drugs, which was perceived as a community unifier.

Another well-known neighborhood presence was the Diggers, a local "community anarchist" group known for its street theater, formed in the mid to late 1960s. One well known member of the group was Peter Coyote. The Diggers believed in a free society and the good in human nature. To express their belief, they established a free store, gave out free meals daily, and built a free medical clinic, which was the first of its kind, all of which relied on volunteers and donations. The Diggers were strongly opposed to a capitalistic society; they felt that by eliminating the need for money, people would be free to examine their own personal values, which would provoke people to change the way they lived to better suit their character, and thus lead a happier life.

During the 1967 Summer of Love, psychedelic rock music was entering the mainstream, receiving more and more commercial radio airplay. The Scott McKenzie song "San Francisco (Be Sure to Wear Flowers in Your Hair)," became a hit that year. The Monterey Pop Festival in June further cemented the status of psychedelic music as a part of mainstream culture and elevated local Haight bands such as the Grateful Dead, Big Brother and the Holding Company, and Jefferson Airplane to national stardom. A July 7, 1967, Time magazine cover story on "The Hippies: Philosophy of a Subculture," an August CBS News television report on "The Hippie Temptation" and other major media interest in the hippie subculture exposed the Haight-Ashbury district to enormous national attention and popularized the counterculture movement across the country and around the world.

The neighborhood's fame reached its peak as it became the haven for a number of psychedelic rock performers and groups of the time. The members of many bands lived close to the intersection. They not only immortalized the scene in song, but also knew many within the community.

The Summer of Love attracted a wide range of people of various ages: teenagers and college students drawn by their peers and the allure of joining a cultural utopia; middle-class vacationers; and even partying military personnel from bases within driving distance. The Haight-Ashbury could not accommodate this rapid influx of people, and the neighborhood scene quickly deteriorated. Overcrowding, homelessness, hunger, drug problems, and crime afflicted the neighborhood. Many people left in the autumn to resume their college studies. On October 6, 1967, those remaining in the Haight staged a mock funeral, Digger happening, "The Death of the Hippie" ceremony. Mary Kasper explained the message of the mock funeral as:

Recent history
After 1968, the area went into decline due to hard drug use, and a lack of policing, but was improved and renewed in the late 1970s.

In the 1980s, the Haight became an epicenter for the San Francisco comedy scene when a small coffee house near Haight Street, in Cole Valley, called The Other Café, 100 Carl Street at Cole Street (currently the restaurant Crepes on Cole) became a full-time comedy club that helped launch the careers of Robin Williams, Dana Carvey, and Whoopi Goldberg.

Attractions and characteristics

The Haight-Ashbury Street Fair is held on the second Sunday of June each year attracting thousands of people, during which Haight Street is closed between Stanyan and Masonic to vehicular traffic, with one sound stage at each end.

See also
The Red Victorian

References

Further reading

External links

 The Haight-Ashbury 30 Years Ago: A Timeline
 The Maze: Haight/Ashbury – 1967 KPIX-TV documentary about the Haight-Ashbury district presented by writer Michael McClure, from the Digital Information Virtual Archive at San Francisco State University
 Who's Who of the Haight-Ashbury Era
The Haight Ashbury Era—a visual essay on the culture of the Haight-Ashbury in the 1960s

 
Counterculture communities
Hippie movement
History of San Francisco
Neighborhoods in San Francisco
Shopping districts and streets in the San Francisco Bay Area
Western Addition, San Francisco